The men's doubles badminton event at the 2011 Pan American Games was held from October 15–19 at the Multipurpose Gymnasium in Guadalajara. The defending Pan American Games champions were William Milroy and Mike Beres of Canada, while the defending Pan American Championship champions were Sameera Gunatileka and Vincent Nguy of the United States. Beres retired after the 2008 Summer Olympics in Beijing, China.

The athletes were drawn into an elimination stage draw.

The draw for the competition was done on October 10, 2011.

Seeds

  (champions)
  (semifinals)
  (quarterfinals) 
  (first round)

Results

Finals

Top Half

Bottom Half

References

Men's Doubles